"The Cat Sat Asleep by the Side of the Fire" is an English nursery rhyme.

Lyrics
One of the most commonly used modern versions of the rhyme is:
The cat sat asleep by the side of the fire,
The mistress snored loud as a pig
Jack took up his fiddle, by Jenny's desire,
And struck up a bit of a jig.

Notes

Year of song unknown
English nursery rhymes
English folk songs
English children's songs
Traditional children's songs
Songs about cats
Songs about music
Songs about sleep
Songwriter unknown